Annual Awards for Telugu Cinema  which is known as Nandi Awards has been given by State Government. "Nandi is Bull" of Lord Shiva.

Best Feature Film -:Sankarabharanam
 Golden Nandi with a cash prize of Rs. 10,000 to the Producer/Banner
 Cash prize of Rs. 4,000 to the  Director
List of winners of the Nandi Award for Best Second Feature Film|Best second Feature Film:  Maa Bhoomi
 Silver Nandi with a cash prize of Rs. 3,000 to the Producer/Banner
 Cash prize of Rs. 1,000 to the Director
List of winners of the Nandi Award for Third Best Feature Film|Best Third Feature Film: Punaadi Raallu
 Bronze Nandi to the Producer/ Banner
 Memento to the Director
 First Best Story Writer
 Cash prize of Rs.1,000

 Second Best Story Writer
Cash prize of Rs. 500 to the Story Writer
(B)DOCUMENTARY FILMS
First Best Documentary film
Golden Nandi with a cash prize of Rs.2,000 to the Producer/Banner
Cash prize of Rs. 1,000 to the Director
           
       
Second Best Documentary film
Silver Nandi with a cash prize of Rs.1,000 to the Producer/Banner
Cash prize of Rs.500 to the Director
Third Best Documentary Film
Bronze Nandi to the Producer/ Banner
Memento to the Director

(C) CHILDREN’S FILMS
First Best Children's film
Golden Nandi with a cash prize of Rs. 10,000 to the Producer/Banner
Cash prize of Rs. 2,000 to the Director
             
       
Second Best Children's film
 Silver Nandi with a cash prize of Rs. 3,000 to the Producer/Banner
 Cash prize of Rs. 1,000 to the Director
           
       
Third Best Children's Film
 Bronze Nandi to the Producer/Banner
 Memento to the Director
(E)EDUCATIONAL FILMS
First Best Educational Film
 Golden Nandi with a cash prize of Rs. 2,000 to the Producer/Banner
 Cash prize of Rs. 1,000 to the Director
      
            
Second Best Feature film
 Silver Nandi to the Producer/ Banner
Third Best Educational Film
 Bronze Nandi to the Producer/ Banner:
Individual Awards for Artistes & Tech
Best Actor : Gokina Ramarao
(Silver Nandi with a cash prize of Rs.10,000 and Commendation Certificate)
Title of the Film : Punaadi Raallu
 Best Actress : Ms.Jayasudha
(Silver Nandi with a cash prize of Rs.10,000 and Commendation Certificate)
Title of the Film : Idi Katha Kaadu
Best Child Actor : Baby Tulasi
(Copper Nandi with a cash prize of Rs.10,000 and Commendation Certificate)
Title of the Film :Sankaraabharanam
 Best Screenplay Writer : B. Narsing Rao
(Copper Nandi with a cash prize of Rs.10,000 and Commendation Certificate)
Title of the Film :Maa Bhoomi
 Best Cinematographer : P. S. Nivas
(Copper Nandi with a cash prize of Rs.10,000 and Commendation Certificate)
Title of the Film :Nimajjanam
Best Lyric Writer : Veturi
(Copper Nandi with a cash prize of Rs.10,000 and Commendation Certificate)
Title of the Film : Sankaraabharanam
Best Music Director : K. V. Mahadevan
(Copper Nandi with a cash prize of Rs.10,000 and Commendation Certificate)
Title of the Film : Sankaraabharanam
BestMalePlaybackSinger:S.P.Balasubramanyam
(Copper Nandi with a cash prize of Rs.10,000 and Commendation Certificate
Title of the Film : Sankaraabharanam
 Best Female Playback Singer :Vani Jairam
(Copper Nandi with a cash prize of Rs.10,000 and Commendation Certificate)
Title of the Film : Sankaraabharanam

References
http://www.hindu.com/2004/06/17/stories/2004061713090300.htm
http://www.hindu.com/2006/11/12/stories/2006111217510100.htm

http://www.hinduonnet.com/2005/09/02/stories/2005090201670200.htm
http://www.hindu.com/2010/11/11/stories/2010111158730400.htm

1979
1979 Indian film awards

te:నంది ఉత్తమ ఛాయాగ్రహకులు